The TASCAM Portastudio was the first four-track recorder based on a standard compact audio cassette tape. The term portastudio is exclusive to TASCAM, though it is generally used to describe all self-contained cassette-based multitrack recorders dedicated to music production. The Portastudio, and particularly its first iteration, the Teac 144, is credited with launching the home-recording wave, which allowed musicians to cheaply record and produce music at home, and is cited as one of the most significant innovations in music production technology.

The Teac 144 Portastudio made its debut in 1979, at the annual meeting of the Audio Engineering Society. It was followed by several other models by TASCAM, and eventually by several other manufacturers.

For the first time it enabled musicians to affordably record several instrumental and vocal parts on different tracks of the built-in four-track cassette recorder individually and later blend all the parts together, while transferring them to another standard, two-channel stereo tape deck (remix and mixdown) to form a stereo recording.

The Tascam Portastudio 244, introduced in 1982, improved upon the previous design with overall better sound quality and more features, including: dbx noise reduction, dual/concentric sweepable EQ's, and the ability to record on up to 4 tracks simultaneously.

In general, these machines were typically used by amateur and professional musicians to record demos, although they are still used today in lo-fi recording. The analog portastudios by TASCAM (a division of TEAC) and similar units by Fostex, Akai, Yamaha, Sansui, Marantz, Vestax, Vesta Fire, TOA, Audio-Technica, Peavey, and others generally recorded on high-bias cassette tapes. Most of the machines were four-track, but there were also six-track and eight-track units. Some newer digital models record to a hard disk, allowing for digital effects and up to 32 tracks of audio.

Function
The Portastudio supported the bouncing of content between tracks, such as creating a mix of three tracks and recording the sum onto the fourth track. By carefully balancing the volume and equalization, this could be done multiple times to create very lush tracks, reminiscent of the complex four-track production of late-sixties Beatles compositions. A limitation was the introduction of tape hiss, which was a particular issue with early models. This was eliminated with more recent digital models.

Unlike standard audio cassette machines that recorded a pair of stereo channels per side, the cassette-based Portastudios recorded four channels in one direction. If you played back a standard two-sided stereo cassette, the second two channels would play in reverse. One interesting (but unpublished) feature was that you could record a track in reverse by flipping the cassette, then flip it back and record additional material. Thanks to the speed control, it was also possible to create a classic flanging effect by recording one track, then recording a second copy of the same track while varying the pitch control, creating a sweeping sound at points where the two tracks converged.

An additional feature was support for external signal processing during recording and on final output.

Notable usages
 Sting wrote "this TEAC 144 was donated to me by the company for some promotional work I did for them in the early 80's. I created many home demos on this machine during that period. All the songs for the album Zenyatta Mondatta, including 'Don't Stand So Close To Me'. As well as the songs for Ghost in the Machine."
Seal originally recorded his multiple Grammy award-winning single Kiss from a Rose on a Tascam 244.
 Guided By Voices recorded much of their classic-era songs on a Tascam 4-track.
 William and Jim Reid of The Jesus and Mary Chain used a TASCAM Portastudio to record their first demos sent to Bobby Gillespie and Alan McGee.
 Primus' first release Suck on This, a compilation of several live performances, was recorded entirely on a TASCAM quarter-inch eight-track portastudio-like device with a built in 8 track reel to reel recorder called the TASCAM 388.
 Lou Reed made the working demos for his 1988 New York album on a cassette multitrack unit. "I had been making these great cassettes at home," he explained to Musician magazine, and Reed chose a recording studio that was able to capture the same sound and spirit, for the album sessions. (A single B-side was drawn directly from a demo cassette.)
 John Frusciante recorded his two first solo albums Niandra Lades & Usually Just A T-Shirt and Smile From The Streets You Hold on a Portastudio 424 (source: VPRO 94 interview).
 Bruce Springsteen recorded his album Nebraska on a Portastudio 144.
 Soviet poet and musician, Viktor Tsoi, frontman of the Soviet rock band Kino, recorded demos in the late 1980s to early 1990s for their main albums on a Portastudio tape recorder. A few of those albums are Gruppa krovi (Blood Type), Zvezda po imeni Solntse (The star called Sun) and Chyorny albom (The Black Album) in couple with a drum machine.
 Travis Meeks of Days of the New recorded "Cling" on a TASCAM four-track in his sessions leading up to his debut album.
 John Vanderslice, an analog recording enthusiast, made Life and Death of an American Fourtracker, a concept album about home recording, including the song "Me and My 424".
 Alan Wilder recorded his first solo album 1+2, under the nickname Recoil, on a four-track Portastudio.
 Ween recorded their second album, The Pod, on a Tascam four-track.
 "Weird Al" Yankovic recorded half of his songs on his debut album with a Portastudio in his drummer's garage before signing up for a proper studio.
 Iron and Wine's debut 2002 The Creek Drank the Cradle was recorded on a four track cassette recorder.
 Madlib recorded his first album as Quasimoto, "The Unseen", on a TASCAM Portastudio.
 Portastatic was named after the Portastudio Mac McCaughan used to record the songs that became its first album.
 The Dixie Bee-Liners recorded their Christmas single, "Santa Wants A Whiskey", on a TASCAM 788.
 Nik Kershaw recorded the demos to his album, "Human Racing", on a Portastudio.
 Clive Gregson and Christine Collister recorded their 1987 album Home And Away on a TASCAM (referred to as 'TEAC' in the album sleeve notes) 244 Portastudio.
 Mac Demarco recorded his 2012 debut mini-LP Rock and Roll Night Club with a TASCAM 244 Portastudio. It made extensive use of the 244's pitch control and used the method of bouncing 3 separate tracks down to a single track.
 Norwegian black metal band Darkthrone recorded several of their albums using a TASCAM Porta 02 4-track studio, dubbed "Necrohell".
 Canadian industrial band Skinny Puppy recorded their first E.P. Back & Forth on a Tascam 244 Portastudio.

See also
 Multitrack recording

References

External links
 The current line of Portastudios from the Tascam website.
 Sting's TEAC Tascam Series 144 Portastudio

Audiovisual introductions in 1979
Sound recording
Audio engineering
Tape recording